Ceremony of the Keys may refer to:

Ceremony of the Keys (Edinburgh), a ceremony at the start of the British monarch's week-long residence there in July
Ceremony of the Keys (Gibraltar), a re-enactment of the locking of the gates to the old Town and garrison of Gibraltar
Ceremony of the Keys (London), an ancient ritual, held every evening at the Tower of London, when the main gates are locked for the night